The 2009 Geneva Golden Tornadoes football team represented Geneva College in the 2009 NCAA Division III football season and finished as NCCAA champions. The Golden Tornadoes played their home games at Reeves Field.

The season began with a non-conference game against , followed by a non-conference game against conference opponent and fellow provisional NCAA Division III member . Following eight conference games in the Presidents' Athletic Conference, the Golden Tornadoes played  in the 2009 Victory Bowl.

Schedule

Coaching staff

Head coach
The head coach was Geno DeMarco, who was in his 17th season at the helm of the Golden Tornadoes.  DeMarco also worked as the offensive coordinator for the team.

Assistant coaches
Assistant coaches for the team were:
 Defensive Coordinator- Mike Pinchotti
 Offensive Line - Jason Wargo
 Defensive Backs - Tom Contena
 Tight Ends/Inside Receivers - Barry Emge
 Wide Receivers - Keith Humphries
 Quarterbacks - Don Costa
 Running Backs - Luke Travelpiece
 Outside Linebackers - Jeff Stephens
 Defensive Line - Mike Wickline

References

Geneva
Geneva Golden Tornadoes football seasons
Geneva Golden Tornadoes football